Events of 2017 in Somaliland.

Incumbents
 President: 
Ahmed Mohamed Mohamoud (until December 13), 
Muse Bihi Abdi (since December 13)
 Vice President: Abdirahman Saylici
Speaker of the House: 
Abdirahman Mohamed Abdullahi (until August 6) 
Bashe Mohamed Farah (since August 6)
 Chairman of the House: Suleiman Mohamoud Adan
 Chief Justice: Adan Haji Ali
 Chief of Staff of Armed Forces: Nuh Ismail Tani

Events

January
January 5

January 23
Two children between the ages of 7 and 13 have died of hunger and thirst in the Tiincarro area in the south of Badhan District due to long drought that affected the country.

February
February 2
The Borama Police arrested four people for a car crash in Borama, killing two children.
February 13

March
March 3
The Somaliland government has deported two foreigners, a man and woman for insulting the religion (Islam), These two were members of DDG and DRC which are based in Denmark.
March 9

April
April 18
Minister of Fisheries and Marine Resources said a fishing boat sank off the sea between Berbera and Ceeldaraad carrying six fishermen, He cited two of them found alive, and the boat and the other four men is missing.

May
May 11
Nearly 17 people died of Cholera outbreak in Xaysimo region due to one of the longest droughts in the history of Somaliland.

June
June 5
Several people were injured in a shootout at Adhicadeeye district of Sool region as a result of clashes between two communities residing in the district.

July
July 1
The certification exams have begun in the country, in which fourth-graders of the secondary and eighth-graders of Intermediate Schools are seated, with a total of nearly 20,000 students nationwide.

August
August 3
The members of the House of Representatives approved the resignation of Speaker of the House (Abdirahman Irro), in an extraordinary session which was attended by 71 of the 82 members of the house.

September
September 23
Group of alcohol smugglers killed a policeman in Sool region, while a young boy died in a riot between supporters of Waddani and Kulmiye parties in Dilla district.
September 28

October
October 11
The National Electoral Commission announced that the presidential election scheduled to be held in November 13, the registered (704,089) voters would be cast in (1642) polling centers in (21) constituencies(degmo doorasho).
October 30

November
November 6

November 22
The newly elected president, Muse Bihi Abdi in his first public address focused on the togetherness, national unity and his plans, which the people of Somaliland welcomed.

December
December 14
The new President of Somaliland named his cabinet members, containing twenty-three ministers and nine deputy ministers.

Deaths

April
April 19
Hassan Gawdhan Yusuf – poet and songwriter.

References

 
2010s in Somaliland
Somaliland
Somaliland